Chester City F.C. were a football club which existed from 1885 until 2010. From 1931 until 2000, and again from 2004 until 2009 they were members of the Football League, playing in the third or fourth tiers of English football. The club persistently had one of the poorest playing records of any Football League sides, and was re-elected to the League on no fewer than seven occasions. From the early 1980s onwards, the club was plagued with financial troubles, selling their Sealand Road ground in 1990 to clear debts. Following their second relegation from the Football League to the Football Conference in 2009, these troubles came to a head, and the club was wound up by HMRC in March 2010.

History

Key
 Top scorer and number of goals scored shown in bold when he was also top scorer for the division.
 Year shown in bold if club season article is created.
 QR1 (2, etc.) = Qualifying Cup rounds
 G = Group stage
 R1 (2, etc.) = Proper Cup rounds
 QF = Quarter-finalists
 SF = Semi-finalists
 F = Finalists
 A (QF, SF, F) = Area quarter-, semi-, finalists
 W = Winners

Seasons

Notes

References

External links

Unofficial website

Chester City
 
Seasons